The Chicago Union Stock Yards fire occurred from December 22 to December 23, 1910 and resulted in the deaths of twenty-one Chicago Fire Department firemen.

Until September 11, 2001, it was the deadliest building collapse in American history, in terms of firefighter fatalities, although the Texas City Disaster of 1947 killed more firefighters overall. It remains the worst such incident in Chicago history.

History

The fire, which broke out at Warehouse 7 of the Nelson Morris Company at the Chicago Union Stock Yards on the 4300 block of South Loomis Street, was first reported on December 22 at 4:09 am.  Half an hour later it was listed as a 4-11 (four alarm) blaze and within a few hours, more than thirty fire engines were battling the blaze.  By the time the blaze was extinguished at 6:37 am on December 23, 50 engine companies and seven hook and ladder companies had been called to the scene. Fire hydrants near the location had been shut off prior to the outbreak of the fire to prevent freezing.

Twenty-one firemen, including Fire Chief James J. Horan, and three civilians were killed when one of the blazing buildings collapsed with them inside. Following Horan's death, First Assistant Chief Charles Seyferlich took command of the operations, diverting men from fighting the fire to search and retrieve the dead firefighters.

Memorials

In 2004, a memorial to all Chicago firefighters who have perished in the line of duty was erected near the location of the 1910 Stock Yards fire. The memorial was created at the urging of Chicago firefighters, who helped to raise about 75% of the $170,000 cost of the statue. At the time it was dedicated, the names of 530 deceased firefighters were carved around its base.

Early film pioneer Freeman Harrison Owens filmed a newsreel of the fire and the firefighting effort.

References

Further reading
Cosgrove, Bill.  Chicago's Forgotten Tragedy. AuthorHouse, 2010. .

External links

 Chicago Public Library Account
 Chicago, IL Union Stockyard Fire, Dec 1910, gendisasters.com

1910 fires in the United States
Building and structure fires in the United States
Fires in Illinois
History of Chicago
1910 in Illinois
Chicago Fire Department
Building collapses in the United States
Building collapses caused by fire